Zwonowice  is a village in the administrative district of Gmina Lyski, within Rybnik County, Silesian Voivodeship, in southern Poland.

The village has a population of 1,255.

Gallery

References

Zwonowice